The Brave Archer, also known as Kungfu Warlord, is a 1977 Hong Kong film adapted from Louis Cha's novel The Legend of the Condor Heroes. The film was produced by the Shaw Brothers Studio and directed by Chang Cheh, starring Alexander Fu Sheng and Tien Niu in the lead roles. The film is the first part of a trilogy and was followed by The Brave Archer 2 (1978) and The Brave Archer 3 (1981). The trilogy has two unofficial sequels, The Brave Archer and His Mate (1982) and Little Dragon Maiden (1983).

Cast
 Alexander Fu Sheng as Kwee Ceng
 Tien Niu as Oey Yong
 Ku Feng as Ang Cit-kong
 Philip Kwok as Ciu Pek-thong
 Wang Lung-wei as Auw-yang Hong
 Ku Kuan-chung as Oey Yok-su
 Ti Lung as Duan Zhixing
 Danny Lee as Auw-yang Hok
 Lee I-min as Yo Kang
 Kara Hui as Bok Liam-ci
 Yu Hoi-lun as Mei Chaofeng
 Wang Chiang-liang as Chen Xuanfeng
 Yu Wing as Wanyan Honglie
 Dick Wei as Yang Tiexin
 Lau Wai-ling as Bao Xiruo
 Bruce Tong as Guo Xiaotian
 Chu Jing as Li Ping
 Fan Mei-sheng as Liang Ziweng
 Chan Shen as Lingzhi Shangren
 Suen Shu-pei as Sha Tongtian
 Tsai Hung as Ke Zhen'e
 Lam Fai-wong as Zhu Cong
 Lo Mang as Han Baoju
 Jamie Luk as Nan Xiren
 Lu Feng as Zhang A'sheng
 Chiu Chung-hing as Quan Jinfa
 Chow Kit as Han Xiaoying
 Lee Siu-wa as Wang Chuyi
 Yeung Hung as Khu Ci-kee
 Yip Tin-hang as Lu Chengfeng

External links
 
 

1977 films
Films based on The Legend of the Condor Heroes
Films based on works by Jin Yong
Films directed by Chang Cheh
Films set in the Jin dynasty (1115–1234)
Films set in the Mongol Empire
Hong Kong martial arts films
1970s Mandarin-language films
Shaw Brothers Studio films
Wuxia films
1970s Hong Kong films